La Métamorphose des cloportes is a 1965 French and Italian crime film comedy directed by Pierre Granier-Deferre.

Cast
Lino Ventura : Alphonse Maréchal
Charles Aznavour : Edmond Clancul
Irina Demick : Catherine Verdier
Maurice Biraud : Arthur
Georges Géret : Rouquemoute
Pierre Brasseur : Tonton
Françoise Rosay : Gertrude
Annie Fratellini : Léone
Daniel Ceccaldi : Lescure
Norman Bart : Un visiteur de la galerie
Georges Blaness : Omar
Dorothée Blank : Une fille à l'hôtel particulier
Jean-Pierre Caussade (as J.P. Caussade)
Marcel Charvey : Un visiteur de la galerie
François Dalou: 2nd Inspector
Michel Dacquin : Un barman de boîte de nuit (as Michel Daquin)

Reception
According to Fox records, the film needed to earn $1,900,000 in rentals to break even and made $700,000, meaning it made a loss.

References

External links 
 

1965 films
1960s French-language films
French crime comedy films
Italian crime comedy films
1960s crime comedy films
Italian films about revenge
French films about revenge
Films directed by Pierre Granier-Deferre
French gangster films
Films with screenplays by Michel Audiard
Films with screenplays by Albert Simonin
1965 comedy films
1960s Italian films
1960s French films
Italian gangster films